Hama Municipal Stadium is a multi-purpose stadium in Hama, Syria. It is currently used mostly for football matches. The stadium has a capacity of 22,000 spectators. It was opened in 1958 and renovated 1996. It is home to Nawair SC and Taliya SC of the Syrian Premier League.

See also
List of stadiums

Football venues in Syria
Multi-purpose stadiums in Syria